[[File:Ratafià di andorno.jpg|thumb|right|220 px|Ratafià di Andorno (Italy)]]

Ratafia is a broad term used for two types of sweet alcoholic beverages, a flavouring essence whose taste resembles bitter almonds, later to a ratafia flavoured biscuit, a biscuit to be eaten along with ratafia, and later still, to a cherry variety.

The Oxford English Dictionary lists the word's earliest date of use as 1699.

Liqueur
Ratafia liqueurs are alcoholic beverages, originally Italian, compound liqueurs or cordials made by the maceration of ingredients such as aromatics, fruits, in pre-distilled spirits, followed by filtration and sweetening, the flavouring ingredients being merely infused in it  Ratafia may be flavored with kernels (almond, peach, apricot, or cherry), lemon peel and spices in various amounts (nutmeg, cinnamon, clove, mint, rosemary, anise, etc.), typically combined with sugar. Other flavorings can be used, such as vegetables and fresh herbs. 

The liqueur is typical of the Mediterranean areas of Spain, Italy, and north-east of France (Champagne and Burgundy). In the south-central region of Italy (specifically Molise and Abruzzo) Ratafià is made exclusively with fresh cherries and Montepulciano d'Abruzzo wines.

Lazzaroni Amaretto, Luxardo Albicocca, Kahlua, Heering Original Cherry Liqueur, Alpenz Saint Elizabeth Allspice Dram, Carlshamms Flaggpunsch, Seale John D. Taylor's Velvet Falernum are Ratafia liqueurs.

Fortified wine
The second type, ratafia de Champagne, a fortified wine, is a type of mistelle, a mixture of marc (grappa) and the unfermented juice of the grape, and is the type produced in France.

 
D.H. Lescombes, in New Mexico, uses Moscato grapes fortified with brandy to stop the fermentation early, which keeps the residual sugar high.

Biscuit
a small macaroon flavoured with almonds− Collins English Dictionary
Ratafia biscuits are made with ratafia essence, sweet almonds, apricot kernels, rosewater, egg white, sugar. Originally made with sweet and bitter almonds, now apricot kernels. Amaretto is a ratafia liquor, thus the ratafia biscuits.

In 1727, The Compleat Housewife by Eliza Smith included a recipe for To make Ratafia Bisket, with the ingredients: bitter almonds, sugar and egg white, making it a confection that is very similar to a modern macaroon.

In 1789, The Complete Confectioner, by Frederick Nutt, a confectioner, formerly apprenticed with Domenico Negri, an Italian who opened "The Pot and Pineapple" confectionery shop at 7-8 Berkeley Square, London, founded 1757, included a recipe, "No. 29. Ratafia Biscuits":

Other uses
Ratafia essence was suggested in a BBC recipe in their 1940 publication Food Facts For The Kitchen Front'', for making mock marzipan, along with soya flour, margarine and sugar.

References
Notes

Sources

Mistelle